Ellery Queen: Don't Look Behind You is a 1971 TV film adaptation of Ellery Queen's novel Cat of Many Tails. It aired on NBC.

Production
The film was intended to spawn a new television series like the earlier versions of the character (The Adventures of Ellery Queen). Richard Levinson and William Link authored the script but were so dismayed with the changes made during production that they took their names off and instead used a pseudonym, "Ted Leighton". This is the only Ellery Queen story or film in which Inspector Richard Queen is portrayed as Ellery's uncle instead of as his father. Critics speculated that this change was made because Harry Morgan was only eight years older than Peter Lawford and because the two had different accents (American and British).

Cast
 Peter Lawford – Ellery Queen
 Harry Morgan – Inspector Richard Queen
 E.G. Marshall – Dr. Edward Cazalis 
 Skye Aubrey – Christy 
 Stefanie Powers – Celeste Phillips
 Coleen Gray – Mrs. Cazalis
 Morgan Sterne – Police Commissioner
 Bill Zuckert - Sgt. Thomas Velie 
 Bob Hastings - Hal Hunter
 Than Wyenn - Registrar
 Buddy Lester - Policeman
 William Lucking - Lt. Summers 
 Pat Delaney - Miss Price 
 Tim Herbert
 Robin Raymond
 Victoria Hale
 Billy Sands as Adrian Abbott

Legacy
While the film failed to generate a series, four years later Levinson and Link were given to opportunity to try again. 1975's Ellery Queen: Too Many Suspects led to Ellery Queen which starred Jim Hutton and David Wayne. The show lasted one season.

References

External links

1971 television films
1971 films
English-language television shows
Films based on American novels
NBC network original films
Films directed by Barry Shear
Ellery Queen films